Amphicyonidae is an extinct family of terrestrial carnivorans belonging to the suborder Caniformia. They first appeared in North America in the middle Eocene (around 45 mya), spread to Europe by the late Eocene (35 mya), and appear in Asia, and Africa by the early Miocene (23 mya). They had largely disappeared worldwide by the late Miocene (8 mya), with the latest recorded species at the end of the Miocene in Pakistan. They were among the first carnivorans to evolve large body size. Later in their history, they came into competition with hesperocyonine and borophagine canids. As dogs evolved similar body sizes and cranial and dental adaptations, the rise of these groups may have led to their extinction. Amphicyonids are often colloquially referred to as "bear-dogs".

Taxonomy
 
The family was erected by Haeckel (1886) [also attributed to Trouessart (1885)]. Their exact position has long been disputed. Some early paleontologists defined them as members of the family Canidae, but the modern consensus is that they form their own family. Some researchers have defined it as the sister clade to ursids (bears), based on morphological analysis of the ear region. However, cladistic analysis and reclassification of several species of early carnivore as amphicyonids has strongly suggested that they may be basal caniforms, from lineages older than the origin of both bears and dogs.

Description
Early amphicyonids, such as Daphoenodon, possessed a digitigrade posture and locomotion (walking on their toes), while many of the later and larger species were plantigrade or semiplantigrade. The amphicyonids were obligate carnivores, unlike the Canidae, which are hypercarnivores or mesocarnivores.

There is often some confusion with the similar looking (and similarly named) "dog-bears", a more derived group of caniforms that is sometimes classified as a family (Hemicyonidae), but is more often considered a primitive subfamily of ursids (Hemicyoninae).

Evolution
It has long been uncertain where amphicyonids originated. It was thought that they may have crossed from Europe to North America during the Miocene epoch, but recent research suggests a possible North American origin from the miacids Miacis cognitus and M. australis (now renamed as the genera Gustafsonia and Angelarctocyon, respectively). As these are of North American origin, but appear to be early amphicyonids, it may be that the Amphicyonidae actually originates in North America.

Other New World amphicyonids include the oldest known amphicyonid, Daphoenus (37–16 Mya).

Amphicyonids began to decline in the late Miocene, and disappeared by the end of the epoch. The reasons for this are unclear; possibly it was due to competition with other carnivorans, as large canids had better adaptations to pursue swift prey in open country, a habitat which spread globally as the new grassland biome replaced more closed environments. However, no direct evidence for this idea has been found. The most recent known amphicyonid remains are teeth known from the Dhok Pathan horizon, northern Pakistan, dating to 7.4-5.3 mya. The species is classically named Arctamphicyon lydekkeri, which may actually be synonymous with a species of Amphicyon.

Fossils of juvenile Agnotherium, Ischyrocyon, and Magericyon all show an unusual type of tooth eruption in which there is a vulnerable stage at about two or three years of age where the subadult animal has no functional molar or carnassial teeth, the only functional cheek teeth being several milk premolars. This period was suggested to be "presumably short" but would have made it very difficult for the animal to process food. This type of tooth replacement is not seen in similar carnivorans like ursids or canids, and may have been one factor in the extinction of the Amphicyonidae.

Classification 
 Family Amphicyonidae
 Genus Aktaucyon
 A. brachifacialis
 Genus Amphicyanis
 Genus Angelarctocyon
 A. australis (formerly Miacis australis)
 Genus Brachycyon
 B. reyi
 B. palaeolycos
 B. gaudryi
 Genus Gustafsonia
 G. cognita (formerly Miacis cognitus)
 Genus Guangxicyon
 G. sinoamericanus
 Genus Harpagocyon
 Genus Harpagophagus
 Genus Ictiocyon
 Genus Paradaphoenus
 P. cuspigerus
 P. minimus
 P. tooheyi
 Genus Pseudarctos
 P. bavaricus
 Genus Pseudocyonopsis
 P. ambiguus
 P. antiquus
 P. quercensis
 Subfamily Amphicyoninae
 Genus Amphicyon
 A. frendens
 A. galushai
 A. giganteus
 A. ingens
 A. laugnacensis
 A. longiramus
 A. lyddekeri
 A. major (type)
 A. palaeindicus
 Genus Cynelos
 C. caroniavorus
 C. crassidens
 C. helbingo
 C. idoneus
 C. jourdan
 C. lemanensis
 C. pivetaui
 C. rugosidens
 C. schlosseri
 C. sinapius
 Genus Goupilictis
 G. minor
 Genus Ischyrocyon
 I. gidleyi 
Genus Magericyon 
 M. anceps 
 M. castellanus
 Genus Myacyon
 M. dojambir
 M. kiptalami
 M. peignei
Genus Namibiocyon 
 N. ginsburgi 
 Genus Pliocyon
 P. medius
 P. robustus
 Genus Pseudamphicyon
 Genus Pseudocyon
 P. sansaniensis
 P. steinheimensis
 P. styriacus
 Genus Tartarocyon
 T. cazanavei
 Subfamily Haplocyoninae (Europe)
 Genus Gobicyon
 G. acutus
 G. macrognathus
 G. yei
 G. zhegalloi
 Genus Haplocyon
 H. elegans
 H. crucians
 Genus Haplocyonoides
 H. mordax
 H. serbiae
 H. ponticus
 Genus Haplocyonopsis
 H. crassidens
 Subfamily Daphoeninae (North America)
 Genus Adilophontes
 A. brachykolos
 Genus Brachyrhyncocyon
 B. dodgei
 B. montanus
 Genus Daphoenictis
 D. tedfordi
 Genus Daphoenodon
 D. falkenbachi
 D. notionastes
 D. robustum
 D. periculosus
 D. skinneri
 D. superbus
 Genus Daphoenus
 D. felinus
 D. hartshornianus
 D. lambei
 D. nebrascensis
 D. socialis
 D. transversus
 D. vetus
 Subfamily Temnocyoninae (North America)
 Genus Mammacyon
 M. ferocior
 M. obtusidens
 Genus Temnocyon
 T. altigenis
 T. ferox
 T. percussor
 T. venator
 Subfamily Thaumastocyoninae
 Genus Agnotherium
 A. antiquus
 Genus Ammitocyon
 A. kainos
 Genus Crassidia
 C. intermedia
 Genus Peignecyon
 P. felinoides
 Genus Thaumastocyon
 T. bourgeoisi
 T. dirus
 Genus Tomocyon
 T. grivense
 Genus Ysengrinia
 Y. americanus
 Y. depereti
 Y. geraniana
 Y. tolosana
 Y. valentiana

References

External links
 Whence the beardogs? Reappraisal of the Middle to Late Eocene ‘Miacis’ from Texas, USA, and the origin of Amphicyonidae 

Prehistoric mammals of North America
 
Eocene carnivorans
Oligocene caniforms
Miocene carnivorans
Pliocene extinctions
Eocene first appearances
Taxa named by Ernst Haeckel
Prehistoric mammal families
Fossil taxa described in 1886